The Little Elm Independent School District is a public school district in Denton County, Texas.

In 2019, the Texas Education Agency rated the District with a "B" rating .

History

In 1865 a one-room log cabin was first used as one of the first attempts of public schooling in Little Elm.  In 1895 the town built the King School Building to provide first through eighth grade education services.  Hackberry, Little Elm and Dickson combined efforts in the 1930s to build the Little Elm Rural High School and it saw its first graduating class in 1974.  In 2004, the new Little Elm High School on Walker Lane opened and the old site became Lakeside Middle School. In 2014 Prestwick STEM Academy opened its doors to K-8 students.  In the fall of 2020, the district expanded yet again and opened two new middle schools, Lowell Strike Middle School and Jerry R. Walker Middle School.  Efforts in 2022 are being taken in order to provide funding for the construction of two more elementary schools.

Attendance area
The district includes:
 The majority of Little Elm
 All of: Lakewood Village, and Hackberry
 Portions of: The Colony, Oak Point and Frisco.

Schools

High school
Little Elm High School (Grades 9–12) is a 6-A high school located in eastern Denton County.  The high school has seen growth associated with the increased growth of the town and its surrounding cities. Renee Pentecost was the head principal up until December 2019. Dr. Elizabeth Priddy was the head principal up until . The Little Elm High School Winter Guard team won the 2010 WGI International Winter Guard Competition.

Middle schools
Jerry R. Walker Middle School (Opened fall of 2020)
Dr. Lowell H. Strike Middle School (Opened fall of 2020)

Elementary schools
Grades Pre-K–5
Cesar Chavez Elementary School
Hackberry Elementary School
Lakeview Elementary School
Oak Point Elementary School
Prestwick Elementary School
D.H. Brent Elementary School

Future schools 
After the people of Little Elm voted yes for the Little Elm ISD 2022 bond, the district plans to open two new elementary schools to the district.

 Elementary #7 (est. opening 2025, located in Lakewood Village)
 Elementary #8 (est. opening 2026, located in Valencia; northeastern Little Elm)

Former schools

High schools 
 Hackberry School

From 1876 to 1930, this school would serve students until it consolidated with the Little Elm School District and the community of Dickson to form the Little Elm Rural High School.

 Little Elm Rural High School

This school would open in 1930 as the high school for the town. It would eventually close, and students would start getting bused to Denton and Frisco high schools instead.

 Little Elm High School (Lobo Ln)

Sometimes referred to now as the "old Little Elm High School", it would open in the 1970s as a high school for Little Elm. It served the whole district until 2004 whenever the district decided to move the high school. It would get replaced by Lakeside Middle School.

Middle schools 
 Little Elm Middle School

Little Elm Middle School opened in 1985 by the original Little Elm High School. It would serve students in Little Elm until 2004 as the high school moved across town, so the middle school would now occupy the old High School.

 Lakeside Middle School

When the Little Elm High School moved, a middle school would take this place. Originally called Lakeside Junior High School, it would be the city's middle school from 2004 up to 2020 whenever Walker and Strike Middle Schools opened. It would later be replaced with an administration building that year.

Intermediate schools 
 D.H. Brent Intermediate

Opened in 2000, Brent Intermediate would serve some of the districts students from 4th-6th grade (later on shortened to 5-6) in between elementary in middle school. They would serve these students until it was closed in approx. 2011 and transformed into an elementary school.

 Colin Powell Intermediate

After the High School was moved from Lobo Ln to Walker Ln, what was formerly the middle school would be used as an intermediate school. Later on, it would become just a 6th grade center which would feed into Lakeside Middle. It would be a 6th grade center until its closure in 2020 following the construction of the new middle schools.

 Prestwick STEM Academy

Prestwick was originally built as a K-8 school in The Colony in 2014. It would serve students throughout 8-9 years, as a merge of an elementary and middle school. It would later on go to just a K-5 elementary school in 2020 following the opening of Strike Middle School nearby Prestwick.

Elementary schools 
 Deliah King Elementary

Deliah King Elementary was opened as a schoolhouse for the then small Little Elm around 1895 or 1896. It would serve Little Elm as an elementary school for almost 100 years. After several renovations, it would be transformed into a early learning center in 1995 and would be closed and later demolished in 2012.

 Hershel Zellars Elementary

Zellars was opened in 1995 as King was transformed. It would serve students until it transformed into an administration building in 2014. In 2022, it would later become a childcare center in 2022.

Other buildings

Athletic use 

 Lobo Stadium

Formerly known as the Little Elm Athletic Complex, this stadium hosts home games for Little Elm High School. It also holds the location for the district rivalry Walker vs Strike middle school games; along with other athletic events for the city.

 Marion Field

Formerly where the LEHS and Lakeside Middle School Lobos played, this field complex behind the original high school is sometimes used for athletic events.

 LEHS Indoor Facility

Administration usage 

 Little Elm ISD Administration Building

Formerly the high school and middle school, it is now used for administration purposes since 2020.

Other 

 Hershel Zellars Early Childhood Learning Center
 Joel Moses Operations and Transportation Facility

Gallery

References

External links

School districts in Denton County, Texas